Louis Alec Fouché (22 December 1912 – 1971) was a South African shot putter who won a gold medal at the 1938 British Empire Games.

References

External links

commonwealthgames.com results
Louis Fouché's genealogical profile

1912 births
1971 deaths
South African male shot putters
Athletes (track and field) at the 1938 British Empire Games
Commonwealth Games gold medallists for South Africa
Commonwealth Games medallists in athletics
Medallists at the 1938 British Empire Games